The Minister of Transport of Austria heads the Federal Ministry for Climate Action, Environment, Energy, Mobility, Innovation and Technology.

Ministers

First Republic

Second Republic

See also 
 Ministry of Transport (Austria)

Notes

References 

Transport